USS Richard S. Bull (DE-402) was a  in service with the United States Navy from 1944 to 1946. She was finally sunk as a target in 1969.

Namesake
Richard Salisbury Bull Jr. was born on 6 January 1913 in Wilkinsburg, Pennsylvania. Graduating from the United States Naval Academy, he was commissioned ensign on 4 June 1936. Trained as a naval aviator in 1938–39 at Naval Air Station Pensacola, Florida, he served in the fleet in 1941. He became a naval observer assigned to the American Embassy in London, England.

Reporting for duty as a fighter pilot on board  on 27 December 1941, he missed out on the early raids against the Japanese as his squadron VF-2 was converting from Brewster F2A Buffalos to Grumman F4F Wildcats (their place being taken by the Grumman-equipped VF-3). In the Battle of the Coral Sea on 8 May 1942, he led the escort section assigned to Lexington's Air Group Commander, Cdr. William B. Ault. After Ault and his men had dive-bombed the carrier Shokaku, scoring one hit, Bull and his wingman, Ens. John B. Bain, were attacked by Zero fighters. Bain managed to fight his way out, but Bull was never seen again. He was posthumously awarded earned the Distinguished Flying Cross.

History 
The ship's keel was laid down on 18 August 1943 by Brown Shipbuilding Co. at their yard in Houston, Texas. The vessel was launched on 16 November 1943, sponsored by Mrs. Richard S. Bull Sr., and commissioned on 26 February 1944.

World War II
Following shakedown off Bermuda, Richard S. Bull departed Boston, Massachusetts on 6 May 1944, and proceeded via the Panama Canal to Pearl Harbor, arriving on 30 May. Reaching Eniwetok 27 June, she escorted  and other escort carriers to Pearl Harbor, arriving on 5 July.

Returning to Eniwetok, she joined a task force including  on 6 August. Arriving at Manus on 13 August, Williams supported the landings on Morotai on 15 September. Departing Manus, she protected carrier forces supporting the landings on Leyte on 20 October. The destroyer escort rescued a fighter pilot from the escort carrier  on 22 October.

Following a kamikaze attack upon Taffy One, she rescued 24 men from the escort carrier . Nearby, the destroyer escort  sank I-45.

Departing the Iwo Jima area 10 March, she proceeded via Guam and Ulithi to the Okinawa Gunto.

From 1 April to 16 May, she protected escort carriers supporting assault forces on Okinawa. Returning 2 June from Saipan, she continued to guard carrier air operations against Okinawa. Voyaging with the escort carrier  to arrival at Leyte on 23 June, she joined the Philippine Sea Frontier, escorting convoys to Morotai, Hollandia, and Ulithi. She provided medical treatment 30 August to casualties aboard SS Peter White, damaged by a mine in the northern Philippines. Following convoy escort duty from Leyte to Ulithi and Okinawa, she departed Leyte on 14 October, and steamed via Eniwetok and Pearl Harbor to San Diego, California, arriving on 6 November.

Decommissioning 

She entered the Pacific Reserve Fleet in March 1946, and remained in the Reserve Fleet until struck from the Navy List on 30 June 1968, and sunk as a target off California on 24 June 1969.

Awards 

Richard S. Bull received five battle stars for her service in the Pacific War.

References

External links 

 Dictionary of American Naval Fighting Ships — USS Richard S. Bull (DE-402)
 NavSource Online: Destroyer Escort Photo Archive — USS Richard S. Bull (DE-402)

 

John C. Butler-class destroyer escorts
Ships built in Houston
1943 ships
World War II frigates and destroyer escorts of the United States
Ships sunk as targets
Shipwrecks of the California coast